Goodwin is a surname. 

Notable people with the surname include:

 Albert Goodwin (disambiguation), several people
 Alexander T. Goodwin (1837–1899), New York politician
 Alfred Goodwin (1923–2022), American federal judge
 Alfred Goodwin (pentathlete) (1902-1920), British modern pentathlete
 Andrew Goodwin (tenor), Australian tenor
 Andrew Goodwin (cricketer) (born 1982), English cricketer
 Archie Goodwin (disambiguation), several people
 Barry Goodwin, American economist
 Betty Goodwin, Canadian artist
 Brandon Goodwin (basketball) (born 1995), American professional basketball player
 Brian Goodwin (1931–2009), Canadian mathematician
 Bronx Goodwin, Australian rugby league footballer (son of Ted Goodwin)
 Bryson Goodwin, Australian rugby league footballer (son of Ted Goodwin)
 Carte Goodwin, American politician from West Virginia
 Charles Wycliffe Goodwin (1817–1878), British egyptologist, bible scholar, lawyer and judge
 Craufurd Goodwin (1934–2017), Canadian-born American historian of economic thought
 Daisy Goodwin (born 1961), British television producer, poetry anthologist and novelist
 Dan Goodwin, American amateur stuntman
 Denis Goodwin (1929–1975), British comedy writer
 Derek Goodwin (1920–2008), British ornithologist
 Doris Kearns Goodwin (born 1943), American historian
 Dorothy Goodwin (1914–2007), American educator and politician
 Elaine M. Goodwin, British mosaic artist
 Francis Goodwin (disambiguation), several people
 Fred Goodwin (born 1958), Royal Bank of Scotland executive
 Freddie Goodwin (born 1933), English football player
 Ginnifer Goodwin (born 1978), American actress from TV shows Big Love and Once Upon a Time, among other works
 Gordon Goodwin (born 1955), American jazz pianist, saxophonist, composer, arranger and conductor
 Gordon Goodwin (athlete) (1895–?), British athlete
 Hannibal Goodwin (1822–1900), American Episcopal priest and film technology inventor
 Harold Goodwin (disambiguation), several people
 Harry Goodwin (1924–2013), British photographer
 Harry Goodwin (cricketer), cricketer
 Henry B. Goodwin (1878–1931), Swedish photographer and expert on Nordic languages 
 Ichabod Goodwin (1796–1882), American politician, former Governor of New Hampshire
 Jason Goodwin (born 1964), British writer and historian
 Jeff Goodwin, American sociology expert
 Jennie Goodwin, New Zealand journalist, television newsreader and continuity announcer
 Jim Goodwin (born 1981), Irish footballer
 Jim Goodwin (baseball), American baseball player
 Jimi Goodwin (born 1970), English rock musician (The Doves)
 John Goodwin (disambiguation), several people
 Jonathan Goodwin (disambiguation), several people
 Ken Goodwin (disambiguation), several people
 Laurel Goodwin (1942-2022), American actress
 Lavinia Stella Goodwin (1833-1911), American author, educator
 Luke Goodwin (born 1973), Australian rugby league footballer
 Marquise Goodwin (born 1990), American football player
 Matt Goodwin (born 1960), Australian rugby league footballer
 Matthew Goodwin (born 1981), British political scientist
 Melanie Wade Goodwin (1970–2020), member of the North Carolina General Assembly
 Murray Goodwin (born 1972), Zimbabwean Test cricketer
 Nat Goodwin (1857–1919), American actor and vaudevillian 
 Philip R. Goodwin (1881–1935), American painter and illustrator
 Raven Goodwin (born 1992), American actress
 Sir Reg Goodwin (1908–1986), British politician
 Ron Goodwin (1925–2003), British composer and conductor
 Richard B Goodwin (born 1934), British film producer
 Richard M. Goodwin (1913–1996), US American economist
 Richard N. Goodwin (1931-2018), American writer, lawyer, and speechwriter
 Sid Goodwin (1915–1980), Australian rugby league footballer
 Simon Goodwin (born 1976), Australian rules footballer
 Ted Goodwin (born 1953), Australian rugby league footballer
 Thomas Goodwin (1600–1680), British Puritan preacher 
 Tom Goodwin (born 1968), American professional baseball player
 Trudie Goodwin (born 1951), English actress
 W. A. R. Goodwin (1869–1939), American preacher who led Colonial Williamsburg preservation effort
 Wayne Goodwin (born 1967), American politician
 William Goodwin (disambiguation), several people named Bill, Billy or William

Fictional characters
 Archie Goodwin (character) a fictional detective in the Nero Wolfe books
 Caitlyn Goodwin (Magical DoReMi), a character from the Ojamajo Doremi Japanese series

English-language surnames